All Else Failed is a 2003 album by the metalcore band Zao, released on February 19, 2003, by Solid State/Tooth & Nail/EMI. It features newly recorded versions of eight of ten tracks from their original debut album, All Else Failed (1995). The recording was done during the same session as Parade of Chaos.

Track listing

Credits
Dan Weyandt - lead vocals
Scott Mellinger - guitar, bass
Jesse Smith - drums, vocals, guitar

References

Zao (American band) albums
2003 albums
Tooth & Nail Records albums
Solid State Records albums